This is a list of airports in Slovenia, grouped by type and sorted by location.

Slovenia, officially the Republic of Slovenia, is a country in Central Europe touching the Alps and bordering the Mediterranean. Slovenia borders Italy on the west, the Adriatic Sea on the southwest, Croatia on the south and east, Hungary on the northeast, and Austria on the north. The capital and largest city of Slovenia is Ljubljana.

Slovenia has 3 civil IFR airports, one military air base, 12 VFR-only airports, and 40 airstrips.



Airports 

Airport names shown in bold indicate the airport has scheduled service on commercial airlines.

See also 
 Transport in Slovenia
 Slovenian Air Force and Air Defence
 List of airports by ICAO code: L#LJ – Slovenia
 Wikipedia: WikiProject Aviation/Airline destination lists: Europe#Slovenia

References

External links 
Lists of airports in Slovenia:
VFR charts - Slovenia
Aircraft Charter World
The Airport Guide
World Aero Data
A-Z World Airports
FallingRain.com
FlightMap Slovenia
Great Circle Mapper: Airports in Slovenia

Slovenia
 
Airports
Airports
Slovenia